Qeshlaq-e Khalilu Heydar (also Romanized as Qeshlāq-e Khlaīllū Ḩeydar) is a village in Qeshlaq-e Shomali Rural District, in the Central District of Parsabad County, Ardabil Province, Iran. At the 2006 census, its population was 71, in 13 families.

References 

Towns and villages in Parsabad County